The Cholfirst Tunnel is a tunnel in Switzerland. The tunnel lies in the northern canton of Zuerich, and forms part of the Autostrasse A4.

The tunnel has three lanes (two heading for Zurich, and one heading for Schaffhausen). There is no central reservation.

References

Road tunnels in Switzerland
Buildings and structures in the canton of Zürich
Tunnels completed in 1996